Faustina is a 1968 Italian comedy film. It represents the directorial debut of Luigi Magni and the first released film appearance of actress Vonetta McGee, the latter of whom had filmed her role for The Great Silence a year prior.

Cast 
 Vonetta McGee: Faustina Ceccarelli
 Enzo Cerusico: Enea Troiani
 Renzo Montagnani: Quirino
 Franco Acampora: Ezio, Quirino's accomplice
 Ottavia Piccolo: Young Peasant

References

External links

1968 films
Commedia all'italiana
Films directed by Luigi Magni
Films scored by Armando Trovajoli
1968 comedy films
Italian comedy films
1960s Italian films